Norway–Russia relations are the bilateral foreign relations between the two countries, Norway and Russia. The establishment of diplomatic relationships between the two countries happened on October 30, 1905, four days after the establishment of Norway's independence. Russia has an embassy in Oslo and consulates in Barentsburg and Kirkenes, and Norway has an embassy in Moscow, and consulates in Murmansk and Saint Petersburg. The countries are neighboring each other along a 195.7 km (121.6 mi) long border.

Timeline

1537–1814
Denmark handled the foreign relations of Norway during this period. Denmark and Russia were in general allies against their mutual enemy Sweden. See Denmark–Russia relations.

1814–1905
Sweden handled the foreign relations of Norway during this period. The Norway–Russia border was defined in 1826.

1917–1991

After 1991
On 27 April 2010 Norway and Russia officially resolved the territorial dispute in the Barents Sea.
Akhmed Zakayev's visit to Oslo Freedom Forum in May 2012, led to formal complaints by Russia.

Strains in bilateral relations
The environmentally harmful emissions from the Norilsk Nickel plant outside Nikel in the Murmansk Oblast have been for decades an unresolved issue in then Norwegian–Soviet, and now Norwegian–Russian relations.

Formerly there was a territorial dispute over the Barents Sea, but on 27 April 2010, Norway and Russia officially resolved the territorial debate. A 2017 Kremlin maritime threat assessment which was sent to President Vladimir Putin highlighted Norway as a perceived threat and therefore a potential cause of naval conflict.

In December 2017, Frode Berg, a Norwegian citizen, was arrested in Russia on allegations of having operated a spy ring in the country since 2015, and was detained at Lefortovo Prison.

In 2017, hackers believed to be Russians targeted the Labour Party. In July 2020, Norway expelled a Russian diplomat on suspicion of espionage.

There has long been tension over the GLOBUS radar installation in Vardø, which Russian officials believe to be part of a United States missile defense system. Two mock airstrikes involving Russian fighter jets and bombers were executed against the town in 2017 and 2018, each time pulling short of violating Norwegian airspace, and in 2019 a Bal coastal missile system was deployed 70 km from the radar system, just 35 km from the Norwegian-Russian land border.

In popular culture

The fictional political thriller TV series Occupied is based on a hypothetical strain in relations between the two countries after Norway ceases fossil fuel production in response to a climate crisis. It is available on Netflix in many countries.

Vyacheslav Pavlovsky, the Russian ambassador to Norway, told Russian News Agency TASS,
It is certainly a shame that, in the year of the 70th anniversary of the victory in World War II, the authors have seemingly forgotten the Soviet Army's heroic contribution to the liberation of northern Norway from Nazi occupiers, decided, in the worst traditions of the Cold War, to scare Norwegian spectators with the nonexistent threat from the east.

The Russian embassy had been informed in an early stage of the work on the series.

Gallery

See also

Norway–Soviet Union relations
Norway–Russia border
Pomor trade

External links

Norwegian embassy in Moscow
Russian embassy in Oslo

Notes

Literature 
 Соседи на Крайнем Севере: Россия и Норвегия: От первых контактов до Баренцева сотрудничества. Учебное пособие / Под ред. Т. Т. Фёдоровой. — Мурманск: Мурманское книжное издательство, 2001. — 384 с. — 1000 экз. — 

 
Bilateral relations of Russia
Russia